The 110th Separate Mechanized Brigade named after Marko Bezruchko is a brigade of the Ukrainian Ground Forces formed in 2022.

History 
The unit exclusively uses equipment donated or purchased from the Czech Republic.

Structure 
As of 2023 the brigade's structure is as follows:

 110th Separate Mechanized Brigade
 Headquarters & Headquarters Company
 1st Mechanized Battalion
 2nd Mechanized Battalion
 3rd Mechanized Battalion
 Tank Battalion
 Artillery Group
 Anti-Aircraft Defense Battalion
 Reconnaissance Company
 Engineer Battalion
 Logistic Battalion
 Signal Company
 Maintenance Battalion
 Radar Company
 Medical Company
 CBRN Protection Company

References 

Military units and formations of the 2022 Russian invasion of Ukraine
Military units and formations of Ukraine
Military of Ukraine